Crystal Mall may refer to:

Crystal Mall (British Columbia), a mall in Burnaby, British Columbia.
Crystal Mall (Connecticut), a mall in Waterford, Connecticut.